Miranpur is a town located in the Punjab province of Pakistan. It is located in Lahore District at 31°17'0N 73°7'0E with an altitude of 172 metres (567 feet) and lies near to the city of Lahore. Neighbouring settlements include Kot Guraya to the south, Khushipur to the east and Bilochwala to the west.

References

Populated places in Lahore District